Walter Christian Mair (born 17 December 1978) is an Austrian-born composer.

Biography 
Ivor Novello-nominated and Telly Award-winning composer Walter Mair creates original scores for feature films, television drama, commercials, and narrative-driven interactive entertainment such as computer games.

Mair studied in Austria, the country of his birth, gaining a degree in music composition for orchestra from the Vienna University and a major in music composition for motion pictures from Salzburg University.

He has written the music for the Universal Pictures documentary feature Ronaldo, directed by BAFTA winning director Anthony Wonke. In 2016, Walter Mair scored the music for Toby Tobias' thriller Blood Orange starring Ben Lamb and Iggy Pop. In television, he has written music for BBC 1's Cuffs and E4's teen drama mini-series Glue. His music can be heard in Rockstar's Grand Theft Auto video games, Sony's sci-fi franchise Killzone, Tom Clancy's Splinter Cell: Conviction and The Creative Assembly's Total War series.

He writes in a wide range of styles, from large orchestral symphonic scores with choir down to smaller ensembles and also intersperses electronics and hybrid or bespoke sounds with live solo instruments.

Walter Mair has written the music and created sound design for numerous commercials for television and cinema campaigns including for Range Rover, Audi and Jaguar.

Mair works out of a state-of-the-art recording studio in Soho, London and is represented by The Gorfaine/Schwartz Agency. He is a member of the British Academy of Film and Television Arts (BAFTA) and British Academy of Songwriters, Composers and Authors (BASCA).

References

External links 
 
 

1978 births
Austrian composers
Austrian male composers
Living people
Video game composers